Hepple is a surname. Notable people with the surname include:

Alan Hepple (born 1963), Canadian ice hockey player
Anne Hepple (1877–1959), British writer
Bob Hepple (1934–2015), South African academic
Cameron Hepple (born 1988), Bahamian footballer
Edward Hepple (1914–2005), Australian actor and screenwriter
George Hepple (1904–1997), English fiddler
Harry Hepple (born 1983), English actor
Norman Hepple (1908-1994), English portrait painter, engraver and sculptor
Robert Hepple, English footballer